Australiceras is an extinct ammonite genus from the upper part of the Early Cretaceous, Aptian stage, included in the family Ancyloceratidae.

Description 
Australiceras has an evolute shell, coiled with all whorls showing in keeping with its inclusion in the Ancyloceratida.  The inner, early, whorls bear ribs that alternate between those that are smooth and those the bear stout blunt or conical tubercles. Ribs on the outer whorls become free of tubercles and end up all smooth.

Australiceras bears some resemblance to Tropaeum and Balearites, both related genera.

The type species is Australiceras jacki.

References 
Notes

Bibliography
 W. J. Arkell et al. 1957. Mesozoic Ammonoidea, Treatise on Invewrtebrate Paleontology, Part L. Geological Society of America, R.C.Moore, (ed)
 F. W. Whitehouse. 1926. "The Cretaceous Ammonoidea of Eastern Australia", Memoirs of the Queensland Museum 8(3):195-242.

Ammonitida genera
Cretaceous ammonites
Cretaceous animals of Africa
Aptian life
Ancyloceratoidea